Chuvashsky Nagadak (Sıwaş Nuğaźaq; , Çăvaş Nukasak) is a rural locality (a village) in Nagadaksky Selsoviet, Aurgazinsky District, Bashkortostan, Russia. The population was 408 as of 2010. There are 5 streets.

Geography 
Chuvashsky Nagadak is located 41 km northeast of Tolbazy (the district's administrative centre) by road. Tatarsky Nagadak is the nearest rural locality.

References 

Rural localities in Aurgazinsky District